Erkki Kaila, previously Erik Johansson (2 June 1867 in Huittinen – 9 December 1944 in Turku) was the Archbishop of Turku, and the spiritual head of the Evangelical Lutheran Church of Finland between 1935 and 1944. He was a Member of Parliament between 1917 and 1927, representing the Finnish Party from 1917 to 1918 and the National Coalition Party from 1918 to 1927.

External links
Archbishops of Turku: Erkki Kaila 

1867 births
1944 deaths
People from Huittinen
People from Turku and Pori Province (Grand Duchy of Finland)
Lutheran archbishops and bishops of Turku
Finnish Party politicians
National Coalition Party politicians
Members of the Parliament of Finland (1917–19)
Members of the Parliament of Finland (1919–22)
Members of the Parliament of Finland (1922–24)
Members of the Parliament of Finland (1924–27)
People of the Finnish Civil War (White side)
20th-century Lutheran archbishops